Rājbhandāri (राजभण्डारी) is a Newar Chatharīya Srēstha clan residing primarily in Kathmandu Valley and other parts of Nepal. It is said that the Malla king Jayasthiti Malla appointed treasurers to look after the wealth. The king honored them with the title of “Bhandari”. As time passed, the bhandari were replaced by the Raj-bhandari. By 17th CE, Rajbhandari was a prominent aristocratic clan serving as courtiers & military chiefs in the Malla courts. Similalrly, Rajbhandaris are appointed as the traditional treasurers, the chief non-Vedic assistant-priests of Pashupatinath Temple of Kathmandu and military leaders.Presently, 108 Rajbhandaris perform rituals as assistant priests and chief patrons of the various temples in the Pashupati area.

Rajbhandaris are descendants of the Suryavansha and Agnivansha Rajput kings who migrated to the Kathmandu valley during Malla rule, and presently, Rajbhandaris belong to the high-caste Kshatriya (pronounced Chathariya) Newārs, marrying among other clans such as Malla (मल्ल), Māskay (मास्के), Joshi (जोशी), Pradhānanga (प्रधानांग), Pradhān (प्रधान), Acharya/Karmāchārya (आचार्य), Amātya (अमात्य), Vaidhya (वैद्य), etc. They are considered as “Brahmaputra Kshatri (ब्रह्मपुत्र क्षत्री)” who are required to wear “Janai” (the sacred thread) around their neck. In modern times, the tradition became less strict. Surnames "Bhani (भनी)", "Bhari (भारी)", "Bhariju (भारिजु)", "Talchabhari (ताल्चाभारी)", "Bhandel/Bhadel (भँडेल/भदेल)" are all local variants of "Rajbhandari".

Originally, three types of Rajbhandari lived in Nepal according to their “Gotra” (lineage) and the social status

 Rajbhandari of Bhadgaon (Bhaktapur): Bhāradwaja
 Rajbhandari of Kantipur (Kathmandu): Kāsyapa
 Rajbhandari of Lalitpattan (Lalitpur): Kashib

Notable people
 Gehendra Bahadur Rajbhandari - "Senior Minister", Acting Prime Minister of Nepal, 1970-71.
 Phatteman Rajbhandari - Popular singer, musician
 Kaji Manik Lal Rajbhandari - Bada Kaji, senior bureaucrat
 Sonie Rajbhandari - Miss Nepal International 2014
 Divya Mani Rajbhandari - Philanthropist/Politician, member of Parliament of Federal Parliament of Nepal

References 

Newar
Surnames of Nepalese origin
Newari-language surnames